Peter Samuel Glick is an American social psychologist and the Henry Merritt Wriston Professor in the Social Sciences at Lawrence University. He is known for his research on gender stereotyping and ambivalent sexism. In 2022, Glick, Amy Cuddy, and Susan Fiske were honored with the Society of Experimental Social Psychology's Scientific Impact Award for their 2002 paper proposing the stereotype content model.

References

External links
Faculty page
Profile at Social Psychology Network

Living people
Oberlin College alumni
University of Minnesota alumni
Lawrence University faculty
American social psychologists
Year of birth missing (living people)